Mesmerized or Mesmerised may refer to:

Film and television
 Mesmerized (film), a 1986 American film by Michael Laughlin
 Mesmerised (TV series), a 2015 Australian comedy series

Music
 Mesmerized (Extol album), 1999
 Mesmerized (Meredith Andrews album), 2005
 Mesmerized (EP), by Seirom, 2015
 Mesmerised, an album by Atrox, 1997
 "Mesmerized" (song), by Faith Evans, 2005
 "Mesmerized", a song by Mariah Carey from The Rarities, 2020
 "Mesmerized", a song by Pop Will Eat Itself from The Poppies Say GRRrrr!, 1986

See also
 Hypnosis
 Franz Mesmer
 Mesmerize (disambiguation)